Anbanavan Asaradhavan Adangadhavan, also known as AAA, is a 2017 Indian Tamil-language action comedy film, written and directed by Adhik Ravichandran and produced by S. Michael Rayappan. The film stars Silambarasan in a triple role, along with Shriya Saran and Tamannaah. This film marks Silambarasan's first triple-role film. Initially, the film was intended to be released as a two-part film, titled as AAA-1D. The film has music composed by Yuvan Shankar Raja, with Krishnan Vasant and Ruben handling the cinematography and editing, respectively. 

The film received generally negative reviews from critics with criticism for the screenplay, dialogues, humour, narration and the cameo's.

Plot 
In Dubai, a cop named Ruby interrogates an old man in an attempt to capture the dreaded don Michael. The man narrates Michael's story.

In 1992, in Madurai, Tamil Nadu, Madurai Michael is a notorious thug who works for a smuggler named Senthamarai and kills for money. He spends his time with his sidekicks played by Mahat and VTV Ganesh. Michael falls for Selvi, a girl from his town. Selvi rejects him initially, but later reciprocates his love. She asks him to leave his gangster life and move to Dubai, starting a new life. Michael half-heartedly accepts this. However, an enemy from the same gang backstabs Michael by turning into a witness for many murders committed by Michael and the latter is jail.

Michael then escapes prison with the help of his friends and finds out that Selvi is soon to marry a man of her parents' choice. Understanding that he is going to be on the run forever, Michael leaves Selvi and migrates to Dubai where he rose to become a dreaded gangster.

Back in Dubai, the old man, one of Michael's friends, dies soon after narrating the story. Ruby and the other cops figure out that Michael will be over 50 years old and would be fearing for his life, hiding somewhere. They circle in on Chennai and send a fax of Michael's photo to the police in Chennai. But Michael is revealed to be living a lavish and happy life in Chennai under the alias of Ashwin Thaatha.

Ashwin has all the money he wants in his life except for a woman. So he decides to get married. While interviewing probable brides, he falls in love with a much younger girl called Ramya, who along with her father is running an old-age home. Ashwin mistakes Ramya's friendly talks as a reciprocation of his love and is ecstatic when she decides to tell her father about her love.

At a ceremony, Ramya breaks the news to her father by saying that she loves someone and wants to marry him, but the age difference might be a problem. To Ashwin's surprise, Ramya introduces a younger man called Shiva who looks like Ashwin. It turns out that Shiva is only a few years younger than Ramya and they had pursued a long-distance relationship, he is settled in the US.

A distraught and broken Ashwin resorts to drinking and turns negative when he kidnaps Shiva. He employs a prominent make-up artist and plans to use their resemblance to pose as Shiva and win over Ramya.

Cast 

 Silambarasan in a triple role as Madurai Michael, Ashwin Thatha and Thikku Shiva
 Tamannaah as Ramya
 Shriya Saran as Selvi
 Kasthuri as Agent Ruby
 Mahat Raghavendra as Sabi
 VTV Ganesh as Somu
 Y. G. Mahendra as "Current" Murugan
 Rajendran as Mani/Raju
 Kovai Sarala as Sarala
 Shanmugasundaram as Nattamai
 Pandu as Doctor
 Neelu as Neelu Thatha
 Swaminathan as Swami Thatha
 Lollu Sabha Manohar as Manohar Thatha
 Singamuthu
 Pasanga Sivakumar as Sivakumar
 Kasthuri Patti as Selvi's grandmother
 Madhan Pandian as Madhan
 Sivaji Senthamarai as Senthamarai
 'Sengal Psycho' Ramkumar
 Nellai Siva
 Rahul Thatha
 Sathya NJ
 A. R. Kapoor
 Vijayakumar in a guest appearance
 G. V. Prakash Kumar as Jeeva (cameo appearance)
 Adhik Ravichandran as himself (cameo appearance)

Production 
In February 2016, Adhik Ravichandran revealed that his second directorial venture would star Silambarasan in the lead role, with several members of his crew from Trisha Illana Nayanthara being retained. He revealed that he would direct the film alongside his commitments with another film titled Virgin Maapillai. Yuvan Shankar Raja was signed on to be the music director of the film in June 2016. Trisha held talks with the film about portraying a leading female role but eventually did not sign the project. Later, Shriya Saran was signed on to appear as the lead heroine pairing opposite Simbu, marking her return to Tamil films after a long hiatus. For one of his roles in the film, Silambarasan put on significant weight and grew a beard.

Release

Theatrical 
Sources confirmed that Anbanavan Asaradhavan Adangadhavan will be released in two parts as AAA-1D and AAA-2D, showcasing the characters Madura Michael, Ashwin Thatha and Thikku Siva. and actor Simbu also confirmed that AAA-1D releases on 23 June 2017, as a Ramadan festival weekend, and AAA-2D will be releasing within the end of the year. In an interview with The Hindu, Adhik confirmed that 85% of both the parts have been completed. It has been speculated that the sequel may not be released due to the disappointing reception of the first part.

Home media 
The film was also dubbed in Hindi as Khel Kismat Ka and released on YouTube by Goldmines Telefilms on 8 April 2019.

Music 

The soundtrack of Anbanavan Asaradhavan Adangadhavan is composed by Yuvan Shankar Raja and the first part, AAA-1D is said to have five songs, in which One of the songs will be a TR remix song. Yuvan himself released the album through his music label U1 Records. A single "Trend Song" which had vocals and lyrics by STR himself was released as a New Year special on 30 December 2016. The next single, Rottula Vandi Oduthu also known as "Spiritual Gaana" was released on 2 June 2017 coinciding with Ilayaraja's Birthday. The intro song "Raththam En Raththam" is penned by lyricist Vairamuthu, will be on the lines of his old films.

Reception 
Anbanavan Asaradhavan Adangadhavan received mixed to negative reviews from critcs. The review of The Indian Express was slightly more on the positive side, rating the film 3 out of 5 stars, and stating that "AAA's highlight would be the dialogues, especially ones about lead actor Simbu's father TR Rajendran and humour will draw audience to the theatres." Sify rated the film 2.5 stars, and Indiaglitz rated 2.25 out of 5 stars, stating that "This film is strictly for STR fans." Thinkal Menon from The Times of India rated 2 out of 5, stating that "A suspense cameo towards the end makes things worse as the film, by then, makes one yawn unapologetically." Behindwoods rated 1.75 out of 5 and stated "AAA – Doesn't live up to the expectations." Sreedhar Pillai from Firstpost rated the film 2 out of 5 and summarised that "AAA is hugely disappointing and a crashing bore. The film tests your patience with a confusing screenplay and disjointed narration." India Today rated 2 out of 5 stars, stating that "From what we get, Adhik Ravichandran wanted to bring Subramaniyapuram into his of Trisha Illana Nayanthara space. Save for the bits with Madurai Michael, there's no denial that Anbanavan Asaradhavan Adangathavan is not even an ordinarily made film." The News Minute reviewed it as a loud, tacky "gentlemen" oriented film. Baradwaj Rangan of Film Companion wrote "Adhik Ravichandran appears to make movies with male gaze. He bandages the inabilities and insecurities of his target audience with scene after scene that could be subtitled, "women are like this only."

Controversies 
Several months after the film's release, producer Michael Rayappan and director Adhik Ravichandran met the media to criticise Silambarasan's unruly behaviour and interference during the course of the project. They alleged that during the first schedule, production was delayed by two months because no actress was willing to star opposite Silambarasan for his alleged unprofessionalism and that later, the actor insisted that the team shift to a different town from the finalised town of Madurai, as he did not like the warm climate. After moving the shoot to Dindigul, he continued to refuse to shoot in public areas or on Sundays and regularly failed to turn up as per the agreed schedule. They alleged that during the first schedule, Silambarasan refused to film a song sequence, unfairly requested Shriya Saran to be replaced after she had finished her portions, demanded the shoot to be moved to London from Dubai and made false promises about reducing his body weight as required for the script. During the second schedule, it was alleged that he out-rightly refused to undergo makeup sessions, refused to turn up to shoot on time, demanded a hotel room on the East Coast Road, refused to provide hotel expenses, and demanded that a production executive was sacked. Silambarasan also cancelled the third schedule and demanded that the film be released in two parts against the makers' wishes, while sending his team to Thailand to have leisure time on the producers' money. He later refused to coordinate when completing necessary scenes to make it a two-part film and also half-heartedly provided dubbing work. The producer revealed that out of an agreed schedule of seventy-six days, Silambarasan only worked on thirty-eight days, meaning that the dates of Tamannaah and Shriya Saran were widely wasted. As a result of the incident, Silambarasan was widely criticised by his peers in the Tamil film industry.

References

External links 
 

2010s Tamil-language films
2017 films
Films set in 1980
Films set in the 2010s
2017 masala films
Films scored by Yuvan Shankar Raja
Films shot in Madurai
Films shot in Malaysia
Indian action comedy films
Indian nonlinear narrative films
Films set in Madurai
Films set in the United Arab Emirates
2017 action comedy films